The 2009 Porsche Carrera Cup Deutschland season was the 24th German Porsche Carrera Cup season. It began on 17 May at Hockenheim and finished on 25 October at the same circuit, after nine races. It ran as a support championship for the 2009 DTM season. Thomas Jäger won the championship with 5 points more than Jeroen Bleekemolen.

Teams and drivers

Race calendar and results

Championship standings

Drivers' championship

† — Drivers did not finish the race, but were classified as they completed over 90% of the race distance.

External links
The Porsche Carrera Cup Germany website
Porsche Carrera Cup Germany Online Magazine

Porsche Carrera Cup Germany seasons
Porsche Carrera Cup Germany